Susan M. Kauzlarich is an American chemist and is presently a distinguished professor of Chemistry at the University of California, Davis (UC Davis). At UC Davis, Kauzlarich leads a research group focused on the synthesis and characterization of Zintl phases and nanoclusters with applications in the fields of thermoelectric materials, magnetic resonance imaging, energy storage, opto-electronics, and drug delivery.  Kauzlarich has published over 250 peer-reviewed publications and has been awarded several patents. In 2009, Kauzlarich received the annual Presidential Award for Excellence in Science, Mathematics and Engineering Mentoring, which is administered by the National Science Foundation to acknowledge faculty members who raise the membership of minorities, women and disabled students in the science and engineering fields. In January 2022 she became Deputy Editor for the scientific journal, Science Advances.

Education, career, and service 
Kauzlarich received a Bachelor of Science in chemistry from the College of William & Mary in 1980. Although originally planning to become a high school chemistry teacher, her collegiate mentors encouraged her to pursue graduate studies in chemistry. She did her graduate studies with Bruce A. Averill at Michigan State University, receiving a chemistry PhD in 1985. During her graduate studies, Kauzlarich primarily worked on the synthesis, development and study of low-dimensional conducting materials derived from the layered material FeOCl. Her characterization methods of these new materials included x-ray absorption spectroscopy and neutron diffraction. From 1985 to 1987, Kauzlarich was a postdoctoral fellow with John Corbett at Iowa State University where she explored the synthesis and bonding characteristics of novel extended condensed metal chain compounds built on [R66I12Z] (R=Ln, Y, Sc; Z=B,C,N, C2) clusters.

Kauzlarich joined the department of Chemistry at the University of California, Davis in 1987. She was promoted to associate professor in 1992, promoted to full professor in 1996, and in 2014, distinguished professor. She was the Maria Goeppert Mayer Distinguished Scholar at Argonne National Laboratory from 1997-1998,  Faculty Assistant to the Dean of Mathematical and Physical Sciences from 2010-2013, and chair of the Chemistry department from 2013- 2016.

Kauzlarich served as an Associate Editor for the journal Chemistry of Materials from 2006-2021 and is a Deputy Editor for Science Advances (2022-). She has been a member of the Editorial Advisory Board for the handbook Physics and Chemistry of the Rare Earths since 2002. She was an associate editor for the Journal of Solid State Chemistry from 2000-2005, and as a member of the Advisory Review Board of the Research Corporation for Science Advancement from 2004 to 2010. Kauzlarich is the editor of the book "Chemistry, structure, and bonding of Zintl phases and ions".

Kauzlarich is an advocate for diversity in the chemistry community and is well known for her personal commitment to mentorship. Throughout her career she has built and continues to support a pipeline of women and underrepresented students in the field of chemistry from high school through graduate study. During her career, Kauzlarich's mentorship strategies have expanded to help support a culture shift in her community through discussions, workshops, and development of new initiatives. One of her initiatives has been the development of the American Chemical Society Summer Educational Experience for the Economically Disadvantaged Program (SEED) program which she established at UC Davis in 1988. For her mentorship of students, Kauzlarich was recognized by Barack Obama with the 2009 Presidential Award for Excellence in Science, Mathematics, and Engineering Mentoring. At UC Davis, she serves as committee member for the Center for the Advancement of Multicultural Perspectives on Science, part of the UC Davis "ADVANCE" initiative.  She is also an active member of the steering committees at UC Davis including the Women's Research and Resource Center and Women in Science and Engineering.

Research and notable publications 
Kauzlarich's research focuses on synthesis and characterization of novel solid state materials. Some of Kauzlarich's publications from her independent research career are listed below:

Kauzlarich has also been a longstanding global expert on the preparation of colloidal nanoclusters and most particularly the preparation of challenging to access Group IV derivatives. These materials hold promise in the areas of biomedicine alongside, importantly, next-generation devices with novel optical and transport properties. Listed below are some of her research team's publications in this research area to-date:

Awards 
Kauzlarich has received numerous awards including:

ACS AWARD IN INORGANIC CHEMISTRY (2022)
AAAS Chair-Elect of the Section on Chemistry (2017)
UC Davis Chancellor's Award for Excellence in Mentoring in Undergraduate Research (2017)
Distinguished Professor, UC Davis (2014) 
Francis P. Garvan-John M. Olin Medal (2013)
Geoffrey Coates Lecture, University of Wyoming (2013)
Fellow, American Chemical Society (2011)
Patrick Lecture, Kansas State (2011)
IUPAC Distinguished Women in Chemistry/Chemical Engineering (2011)
Iota Sigma Pi, National Honorary Member (2011)
 Fellow, American Association for the Advancement of Science (2009)
Presidential Award for Excellence in Science, Mathematics, and Engineering Mentoring (2009)
NASA Tech Brief Award NPO 42627: High Efficiency of Yb14MnSb11 For Thermoelectric Power Generation(2006)
UC Davis Distinguished Graduate Mentoring Award (2005)
Outstanding Mentor Award from the UCD Consortium for Women and Research (2001-2002)
Maria Goeppert Mayer Distinguished Scholar Award, Argonne National Laboratory (1997)

References 

American women chemists
Living people
College of William & Mary alumni
Michigan State University alumni
University of California, Davis faculty
People from Worcester, Massachusetts
Year of birth missing (living people)
Rare earth scientists
Solid state chemists
 Fellows of the American Association for the Advancement of Science